Deion Jones (born November 4, 1994) is an American football linebacker for the Cleveland Browns of the National Football League (NFL). He played college football at LSU, and was selected by Atlanta Falcons in the second round of the 2016 NFL Draft.

High school career
Jones attended Jesuit High School in New Orleans, Louisiana, where he was a three-year starter at middle linebacker. As a senior, he had 179 tackles, eight sacks, and three interceptions, helping Jesuit to the LHSAA Class 5A quarterfinals, where the Blue Jays lost to Carencro.

Regarded as a three-star recruit by Rivals.com, Jones was ranked as the No. 31 outside linebacker prospect in the class of 2012. Recruited by Corey Raymond, Jones originally committed to Nebraska in August 2011, but changed his commitment to Louisiana State after receiving a late offer in December 2011.

College career
Under head coach Les Miles, Jones was a backup his first three years at LSU, appearing in 39 games with one start. As a freshman in 2012, he recorded 23 total tackles (three tackles-for-loss). As a sophomore in 2013, he recorded 15 total tackles (one tackle-for-loss). As a junior in 2014, he recorded 26 total tackles (3.5 tackles-for-loss), one pass defended, and one fumble recovery. As a senior in 2015, he became a starter for the first time. In his final collegiate season, he recorded 100 total tackles (13.5 tackles-for-loss), five sacks, two interceptions, one pick-six, three passes defended, and one forced fumble. He was a finalist for the Butkus Award.

Professional career
On December 8, 2015, it was announced that Jones had accepted his invitation to play in the 2016 Senior Bowl. On January 30, 2016, Jones played in the Reese's Senior Bowl and recorded six combined tackles as part of Jacksonville Jaguars' head coach Gus Bradley's South team that defeated the North 27–16. He was limited to 26 snaps, but was able to perform well enough throughout the week to impress scouts and coaches. Jones was one of 34 collegiate linebackers to attend the NFL Scouting Combine in Indianapolis, Indiana and completed most of the drills, but opted to skip the three-cone drill, short shuttle, and bench press. Jones finished fourth among all participating linebackers in the 40-yard dash, eighth in the vertical jump, and finished tenth in the broad jump.

On March 14, 2016, Jones attended LSU's pro day and chose to perform positional drills and all of the combine drills, but opted to stand on his broad jump performance. All together, he performed the 40-yard dash (4.39s), 20-yard dash (2.52s), 10-yard dash (1.52s), bench press (16 reps), vertical jump (35½"), short shuttle (4.26s), and three-cone drill (7.12s). He had an excellent overall performance in the combine drills and positional drills and his 40-yard dash (4.39s) would've finished first among all linebackers at the NFL combine. His time in the 40 was adjusted to an official time of 4.40s and dramatically increased his draft stock and profile. His pro day performance was described as "off the charts" by NFL analyst Gil Brandt. He attended private workouts and visits with multiple teams, including the New Orleans Saints, Indianapolis Colts, Philadelphia Eagles, New York Jets, and San Francisco 49ers. At the conclusion of the pre-draft process, Jones was projected to be a second or third round pick by NFL draft experts and scouts. He was able to raise his draft stock with his performances throughout the draft process and went from a projected third or fourth round pick to an all but guaranteed second rounder. He was ranked the sixth best outside linebacker prospect in the draft by NFLDraftScout.com, was ranked the sixth best linebacker in the draft by NFL analyst Mike Mayock, and was ranked the ninth best linebacker by Sports Illustrated.

Atlanta Falcons
The Atlanta Falcons selected Jones in the second round with the 52nd overall pick in the 2016 NFL Draft. He was the eighth linebacker selected in 2016 and was the first of two linebackers the Falcons selected in 2016, along with fourth round pick (115th overall) De'Vondre Campbell. Jones was also reunited with LSU teammate Jalen Collins. The Falcons decided to draft Jones after linebackers coach Jeff Ulbrich scouted him at the combine. Ulbrich and head coach Dan Quinn thought Jones was an ideal candidate to play middle linebacker with his speed and pass coverage ability.

2016 season: Rookie year

On May 5, 2016, the Falcons signed Jones to a four-year, $4.54 million contract that includes $2.16 million guaranteed and a signing bonus of $1.50 million.

Throughout training camp, Jones competed against veteran Paul Worrilow for the job as the starting middle linebacker. Jones credits Worrilow for guiding him through the beginning of his career and stated Worrilow acted as a mentor even though Jones was drafted with the intent of eventually replacing him. Head coach Dan Quinn named Jones the starting middle linebacker to start the regular season.

Jones made his NFL debut and first NFL start in the season-opener against the Tampa Bay Buccaneers and recorded six combined tackles in a 31–24 loss. On September 26, 2016, Jones collected nine combined tackles, broke up two passes, and returned his first NFL interception for a 90-yard touchdown during a 45–32 road victory against the New Orleans Saints. His interception came in the fourth quarter off a pass attempt by Drew Brees and marked his first NFL touchdown. Jones was inactive for the Falcons' Week 5 victory at the Denver Broncos, after sustaining an ankle injury the previous week. During Week 14, he made five combined tackles, deflected two passes, and returned an interception by Jared Goff for a 33-yard touchdown during a 42–14 road victory against the Los Angeles Rams. Two weeks later, Jones recorded a season-high 13 combined tackles and broke up a pass during a 33–16 road victory against the Carolina Panthers.

Jones finished his rookie year with 108 combined tackles (75 solo), 11 pass deflections, three interceptions, and two touchdowns in 15 games and 13 starts. Pro Football Focus gave Jones an overall grade of 83.0 for 2016, ranking him 20th among all off-the-ball linebackers in overall grades.

The Falcons finished atop in the NFC South with an 11–5 record and received a first-round bye in the playoffs. On January 14, 2017, Jones started his first NFL playoff game and made five combined tackles, broke up a pass, and intercepted Russell Wilson as they defeated the Seattle Seahawks in the NFC Divisional Round. After defeating the Green Bay Packers in the NFC Championship, the Falcons went on to face the New England Patriots in Super Bowl LI. On February 5, 2017, Jones recorded nine combined tackles and one forced fumble off of running back LeGarrette Blount during the Falcons' 28–34 overtime loss.

2017 season
Jones entered training camp slated as the starting middle linebacker after Paul Worrilow departed for the Detroit Lions in free agency.

During Week 4 against the Buffalo Bills, Jones recorded eight combined tackles and made his first NFL sack on  Tyrod Taylor during a 23–17 loss. In Week 14, Jones recorded a season-high 13 combined tackles, broke up two passes, and intercepted Drew Brees in the end zone with less than 90 seconds left, sealing a 20–17 victory over the New Orleans Saints on Thursday Night Football. His performance earned him NFC Defensive Player of the Week. On December 24, 2017, Jones recorded ten combined tackles, defended one pass, and intercepted one pass by Drew Brees in a 23–13 road loss against the Saints.

Jones led the team with 138 combined tackles (91 solo) in 2017 and also recorded ten pass deflections, three interceptions, and a sack in 16 games and starts. The Falcons finished third in the NFC South with a 10–6 record and received a wild card playoff berth. On January 6, 2018, Jones recorded ten combined tackles and defended a pass in a 26–13 road victory against the Los Angeles Rams in the NFC Wildcard game. They were eliminated from the playoffs the following week after losing 15–10 to the eventual Super Bowl LII Champions the Philadelphia Eagles. On January 16, 2018, Jones was named to his first Pro Bowl as a replacement for injured Panthers linebacker Luke Kuechly. Pro Football Focus gave him an overall grade of 89.6 and he ranked sixth amongst all qualifying linebackers in 2017.

2018 season
During the season opener against the Philadelphia Eagles, Jones recorded his first interception of the season off a pass thrown by Nick Foles. On September 11, 2018, Jones was placed on injured reserve with a foot injury. He was activated off injured reserve on November 13, 2018. In Week 15, in a 40–14 victory against the Arizona Cardinals, Jones recorded his second interception of the season, a 41-yard pick-six off a pass thrown by Josh Rosen.

Jones finished the 2018 season with 53 combined tackles, one sack, one forced fumble, and two interceptions in six games and starts.

2019 season
On July 17, 2019, Jones signed a four-year, $57 million contract extension with the Falcons with $34 million guaranteed.

In the regular season-finale against the Tampa Bay Buccaneers, Jones recorded his first and only interception of the season off a pass thrown by Jameis Winston and returned it for a 27-yard touchdown on the first play of overtime to secure a 28–22 road victory. Jones was named NFC Defensive Player of the Week for his performance. With the interception return, he broke the Falcons franchise record for most interceptions returned for a touchdown, previously held by Deion Sanders and Kevin Mathis.

2020 season
In Week 6 against the Minnesota Vikings, Jones recorded his first interception of the season off a pass thrown by Kirk Cousins during the 40–23 win.
In Week 7 against the Detroit Lions, Jones recorded his first full sack of the season on Matthew Stafford during the 23–22 loss. In Week 12 against the Las Vegas Raiders, Jones intercepted a pass thrown by Derek Carr and returned it 67 yards for his sixth career touchdown during the 43–6 win.
In Week 15 against the Tampa Bay Buccaneers, Jones led the team with 10 tackles and sacked Tom Brady once during the 31–27 loss.

2021 season
In Week 7, Jones registered 15 tackles, three tackles for loss, and a sack in a 30-28 win over the Dolphins, earning NFC Defensive Player of the Week.

2022 season
On September 1, 2022, Jones was placed on injured reserve.

Cleveland Browns
On October 10, 2022, the Falcons traded Jones and a 2024 seventh-round pick to the Cleveland Browns for 2024 sixth-round pick. He was activated off injured reserve on October 22.

NFL career statistics

Regular season

Postseason

Personal life
Jones' father named him after Hall of Fame cornerback Deion Sanders. He began being known as "War Daddy" during his stint at LSU. Jones' nickname "Debo" was given to him by his father and is a portmanteau of Deion Sanders and Bo Jackson.

References

External links

LSU Tigers bio
Atlanta Falcons bio

1994 births
Living people
American football linebackers
Atlanta Falcons players
Cleveland Browns players
LSU Tigers football players
Jesuit High School (New Orleans) alumni
Players of American football from New Orleans
National Conference Pro Bowl players